The Valdosta Railway  is a shortline railroad in the U.S. state of Georgia, connecting Clyattville to CSX Transportation and the Norfolk Southern Railway at Valdosta. The company began operations in 1992 as a subsidiary of the Rail Management and Consulting Corporation, and was acquired by Genesee & Wyoming Inc. in 2005.

The line had formerly been operated by the Georgia and Florida Railroad, whose predecessor, the Florida Midland and Georgia Railroad, built the line in the 1880s or 1890s. The Valdosta Southern Railroad  was incorporated in August 1951 and bought the portion from Valdosta south to Madison, Florida, which the G&F planned to abandon. The line was cut back to Clyattville, Georgia in March 1972, and in 1992 the new Valdosta Railway took over operations.

In 2005 the Valdosta Railway was acquired by Genesee & Wyoming.

References

External links

Valdosta Railway official webpage - Genesee and Wyoming website
Map of the abandoned portion of the Valdosta Southern between Clyattville, GA and Madison, FL
HawkinsRails Valdosta Southern page

Georgia (U.S. state) railroads
Genesee & Wyoming
Railway companies established in 1992
Transportation in Lowndes County, Georgia